This is a list of numbered roads in the City of Hamilton, Ontario, in the former Regional Municipality of Hamilton-Wentworth. After the amalgamation of the city and the region in 2001, most regional roads were de-numbered, leaving only a few arterial roads numbered, all of them (with the exception of HR 65) former provincial highways, numbered for continuity.

Hamilton
Roads in Hamilton, Ontario